NA-46 Islamabad-I is a constituency for the National Assembly of Pakistan.

Area
The constituency consists of a mix of urban and rural areas of Islamabad Capital Territory from Sector G-10 to Tarnol and also includes Sector I-10. During 2018 delimitation, NA-49 (Islamabad-II) constituency was divided between this constituency and NA-53 (Islamabad-II). On the granular basis, the following areas of Islamabad are included in this constituency: 
Tarnol
Golra Sharif
Sectors E-8, E-9, E-10, F-8, F-9, F-10, G-10, H-10, and I-10

Members of Parliament

2002–2018: NA-48 Islamabad-I

General elections were held on 10 Oct 2002. Mian Muhammad Aslam of Muttahida Majlis-e-Amal won by 40,365 votes.

2018-2023: NA-54 Islamabad-III

Election 2008

The result of general election 2008 in this constituency is given below.
Anjum Aqeel Khan succeeded in the election 2010 and became the member of National Assembly.

Election 2013

Javed Hashmi succeeded in the election 2013 and became the member of National Assembly.

By-election 2013
The seat fell vacant after Javed Hashmi choose to retain his Multan constituency, a re-election was held on 22 August 2013 and Asad Umar secured a win with 48,073 votes his closest rival was PML-N Chaudhary Muhammad Ashraf Gujjar who came second at 41,186 votes

Election 2018 

General elections were held on 25 July 2018.

By-election 2023 
A by-election will be held on 16 March 2023 due to the resignation of Asad Umar, the previous MNA from this seat.

See also
NA-45 Dera Ismail Khan-II
NA-47 Islamabad-II

References

External links 
 Election result's official website

52
52